Osteodiscus andriashevi  is a species of marine fish in the family Liparidae (snailfishes or seasnails). It grows to a length of  SL. This species is one of three known members of its genus.

The name Osteodiscus is derived from Greek osteon = bone and discos = disc shape, whereas the species epithet andriashevi is in honor of the ichthyologist Anatoly Andriyashev for his outstanding contribution to the study if systematics and zoogeography of fish, and also in connection with his 80th anniversary.

References

Liparidae
Fish described in 1990